The Regni, Regini, or Regnenses were a Tribe which occupied modern West Sussex, East Sussex, south-west Kent, eastern Surrey, and the eastern edges of Hampshire. Their Tribal centre was at Noviomagus Reginorum (Chichester in West Sussex), close to Trisantona Fluvius (the River Arun) which joined the English Channel at Littlehampton, a little way to the east of Noviomagus Reginorum. The tribe was bordered to the west by the Belgae, to the north by the Atrebates, and to the east by the Cantiaci, while much of their northern border was filled by the vast and near-impenetrable Weald Forest. Nevertheless, they were thinly scattered on either side of the Weald, and there were safe paths through the forest.

The people of King Cogidubnus
Before the Roman conquest, their land and capital appear to have been part of the territory of the Atrebates, possibly as part of a confederation of tribes. It has been suggested that, after the first phase of the conquest, the Romans maintained the Atrebates as a nominally independent client kingdom, acting as a buffer between the Roman province in the east and the unconquered tribes to the west. The ruler of the kingdom was Tiberius Claudius Cogidubnus or Cogidumnus: Tacitus says "" ('certain  were given to King Cogidumnus') and remarks on his loyalty. A first century inscription found in Chichester supplies his Latin names, indicating he was given Roman citizenship by Claudius or Nero. Cogidubnus may have been a relative of Verica, the Atrebatian king whose overthrow was the excuse for the conquest. After Cogidubnus's death, the kingdom would have been incorporated into the directly ruled Roman province and divided into several , including the Atrebates, Belgae, and Regni.

Controversies
The name of this people is not entirely certain. This appears to be the same place as Navimago Regentium or Noviomagus Regionorum, from which Regnenses, occurring in some modern sources, appears to be derived. The location is generally supposed to be Chichester. The Antonine Itinerary refers to a place called Regno at the end of Roman Road 7, perhaps referring to a site along the coast of the Solent. Some scholars reject Regnenses in favour of Ptolemy's Regni or a Brythonic name Regini.

Likewise, the theory that Cogidubnus was created , a rank only ever given to senators, is based on reconstructing the damaged Chichester inscription to read as Cogidubni regis legati Augusti in Britannia ('king and imperial legate in Britain'). It more probably reads Cogidubni regis magni Britanniae ('great king of Britain').

References

Celtic kingdoms
Celtic Britons
Roman buffer states
Historical Celtic peoples
Roman client kingdoms in Britain